U.S. Route 66 is a former United States highway. 

Route 66 may also refer to:

Transportation
 List of highways numbered 66
U.S. Route 66
 London Buses route 66, in London, England
 SEPTA Route 66, in Philadelphia, Pennsylvania, U.S.
 National Cycle Route 66, in England

Arts and entertainment

Film and television
 Route 66 (TV series), an American TV series 1960–1964
 Route 66 (1993 TV series), a reboot of the 1960s series
 Route 66 (film), a 1998 American film 
 Route 66: An American (Bad) Dream, a film by VEB Film Leipzig
 Route 66, working title for the 2006 film Cars

Music
 "(Get Your Kicks on) Route 66", a rhythm and blues standard, composed in 1946 by Bobby Troup
 "Route 66 Theme", the theme tune of the TV series
 Route 66 (composition), a 1998 orchestral work by Michael Daugherty
 Route 66 (band), an American band

Businesses
 Route 66 (company), a Swiss navigation technology company
 Route 66 Records, a record label

See also

 Route 66 Association, one of which exists for each state on historic U.S. Route 66
 Route 66 State Park, in Times Beach, Missouri, U.S.
 U.S. Highway 66 Association (1927–1976)
 Phillips 66, a gas station chain
 Route 66 Raceway, a drag racing strip in Joliet, Illinois, U.S.